Surly Bob is a 19th-century English children's novel by Luisa C. Silke.  It was a melodrama about a nasty boy who nonetheless had great affection for his crippled little brother.  It was published as one of Cassell's “Shilling Series” of illustrated children's books and was notable in its day for its pathos, character development and illustrations.  It was originally published in serial form in the British periodical The Quiver. and was considered at the time to be one its principal stories.

The first episode in the series was published in 1875.
The novel was published in book form in 1881.

References

External links
First installment in the Surly Bob series
Surly Bob published as a novel with illustrations

Novels first published in serial form
Victorian novels
19th-century British children's literature
1881 British novels
1880s children's books